The February 2021 North American cold wave was an extreme weather event that brought record low temperatures to a significant portion of Canada, the United States and parts of northern Mexico during the first half of February 2021. The cold was caused by a southern migration of the polar vortex, likely caused by a sudden stratospheric warming event that occurred the prior month. Temperatures fell as much as 25–50 °F (14-28 °C) below average as far south as the Gulf Coast. Severe winter storms also were associated with the bitter cold, which allowed for heavy snowfall and ice accumulations to places as far south as Houston, Texas, and contributing to one of the snowiest winters ever in some areas in the Deep South.

With the record cold advancing so far south, effects were crippling and widespread. Many regions within the Southern Plains such as Oklahoma, Arkansas and Texas broke or nearly reached record-low temperatures not seen in decades or even a century. In the latter state of Texas, the record cold caused enormous strain on the power grid and froze pipelines, leading millions to lose power and many pipes to burst. At least 278 people were killed directly or indirectly by severe cold, and the damages are estimated to exceed $198.575 billion (2021 USD), including at least $197.075 billion in the United States and $1.5 billion in Mexico.

Background
As with most cold waves, the origins of the cold wave occurred when the jet stream migrated southward in early February 2021, allowing bitterly cold air from the polar vortex to spill south into the Upper Midwest and Great Plains. The weakening of the jet stream is likely to have been caused by a sudden stratospheric warming (SSW) event that occurred in early January. However, the effects of this event did not materialize within North America until the pattern began to become unstable near the end of the month. An arctic front then proceeded to usher in the cold air by February 6.

Record temperatures

Canada
On February 7, 2021 Uranium City, Saskatchewan, equaled their all time coldest temperature of −48.9 °C (−56.0 °F) previously recorded on January 15, 1974. In Winnipeg, Manitoba, the high temperature did not rise above -20.0 °C (−4.0 °F) for 9 consecutive days, the longest period since 1996. On February 7, 2021, the International Airport weather station in Edmonton, Alberta, recorded a low temperature of -43.6 °C (−46.5 °F) with two consecutive lows below -40.0 °C (−40.0 °F).

United States
The cities of Billings, Montana, and Fargo, North Dakota, experienced their longest streak of sub-zero temperatures since at least 1983 and 1996, respectively. The cities of Salina, Kansas and Chanute, Kansas spent a record amount of time below .

Records more than a century old were broken: on February 16, daily record lows were broken in Oklahoma City (coldest since 1899 and the second-coldest on record), Dallas (coldest since 1930 and the second-coldest on record), Houston (coldest since 1989), and San Antonio (coldest since 1989). Waco, Texas experienced a record 205 hours of subfreezing temperatures. This put a strain on the state's power grid, resulting in the Southwest Power Pool and the Electric Reliability Council of Texas both instituting rolling blackouts.

Tree limbs and entire trees fell under the weight of the ice, with Salem, Oregon losing 18% of its tree cover.  288,000 households were without electricity in Portland.

Mexico
In the city of Saltillo, temperatures reached as low as  early on February 16 as bitterly cold air surged south from Canada and the United States into the country of Mexico. It was the coldest temperature reported in the city since a cold wave in 2014.

Impact

United States

Texas by far was the state worst affected by the cold wave. Power equipment in Texas was not winterized, leaving it vulnerable to extended periods of cold weather, leading to widespread power outages. Five times as much natural gas as wind power had been lost because of the cold. When power was cut, it disabled some compressors that push gas through pipelines, and the resulting shortage knocked out more gas plants.

See also

2011 Groundhog Day blizzard
Early 2014 North American cold wave
February 2015 North American cold wave
2021 Western North America heat wave
February 13–17, 2021 North American winter storm
February 15–20, 2021 North American winter storm

References

2020–21 North American winter
2021 in the United States
2021 cold waves
Cold waves in Canada
Cold waves in the United States
February 2021 events in North America
es:Ola de frío en América del Norte de 2020-21#Ola de frío de febrero